Carlo Vidano (1923, in Caluso – 1989, in Turin) was an Italian entomologist who specialised in Auchenorrhyncha.
Vidano attended the University of Turin, graduating from the Faculty of Agriculture in 1949. He was immediately appointed assistant professor to the chair of Agricultural Entomology in Turin. In 1968, he became a full professor of Apiculture.

References

Arzone, A.M., Alma, A. and Mazogglio P.J., 2007 Volume in memoria di Carlo Vidano subtitled - Collections made by Prof. Carlo Vidano , original protocols, annotations, comments, observations, drawings, sketches photographs.Memorie della Societa Entomologica Italiana Volume 86 1-480.Supplemento. Bolletino della Societa Entomologica Italiana 139 (3).. Includes full bibliography.

Italian entomologists
People from the Province of Turin
1923 births
1989 deaths
20th-century Italian zoologists